West Second Street Historic District may refer to:

West Second Street Historic District (Mesa, Arizona), listed on the National Register of Historic Places in Maricopa County, Arizona
West Second Street Historic District (Ashland, Wisconsin), listed on the National Register of Historic Places in Ashland County, Wisconsin

See also
Second Street Historic District (disambiguation)
West Second Street Residential Historic District, Hastings, Minnesota, U.S.